Jérôme Mainard (born 25 August 1986) is a French cyclist, who last rode for French amateur team CR4C Roanne.

Major results

2008
 7th Paris–Tours Espoirs
2013
 7th Tour de Berne
2014
 9th Tour de Berne
2015
 5th Overall Rhône-Alpes Isère Tour
 8th Tour du Doubs
 10th Grand Prix de la ville de Nogent-sur-Oise
2016
 6th Overall GP Liberty Seguros
2017
 1st  Mountains classification Circuit des Ardennes
 3rd Overall Rhône-Alpes Isère Tour
 4th Binche–Chimay–Binche
 7th Grand Prix des Marbriers
2018
 5th Grand Prix de la ville de Nogent-sur-Oise

References

External links

1986 births
Living people
French male cyclists
Sportspeople from Roanne
Cyclists from Auvergne-Rhône-Alpes